Celia Rose Gooding (born February 22, 2000) is an American actor and singer. They made their Broadway debut and rose to prominence for the role of Mary Frances "Frankie" Healy in the rock musical Jagged Little Pill for which they won a 2021 Grammy Award for Best Musical Theater Album and was nominated for a 2020 Tony Award for Best Actress in a Featured Role in a Musical, becoming one of the youngest nominees in the category at age 20. Their mother is LaChanze, an American actress, singer, and dancer. Gooding plays the role of Nyota Uhura in the Paramount+ original series Star Trek: Strange New Worlds (2022present).

Early life and education 
Gooding was raised in New York, New York. They were born to actress, singer and dancer LaChanze, and Calvin Gooding, who died in the September 11th attacks. They have one sister, Zaya.

Gooding attended the Hackley School in Tarrytown, New York, with their sister, and graduated with honors in performing arts. They occasionally took leaves of absence from high school to do readings for a musical they were involved in developing, Jagged Little Pill. In the workshop during their junior year, they had three hours of tutoring in the morning before rehearsals, to replace regular schooling. Their senior project revolved around their participation in the show's out-of-town tryout at the end of their senior year. Their other training included studying dance at the Alvin Ailey Institute and studying Acting and Film with a concentration in Shakespeare at the Berridge Conservatory in Normandy.

In 2018, Gooding began attending Pace University. They initially double majored in Musical Theatre and Child Psychology; they dropped the latter major during their second and final semester. They left Pace after their freshman year, as rehearsals for the Broadway run of Jagged Little Pill started in September 2019.

Acting career 
Gooding first wanted to become an actor when they watched their mother win the Tony Award for Best Actress in a Leading Role in a Musical for The Color Purple in 2006 on TV. However, they only started participating in musical theatre productions in ninth grade. Throughout their high school experience, Gooding played various roles such as Carmen in the Rosetta LeNoire Musical Theatre Academy's production of Fame.

In 2017, at age 17, Gooding was cast in the first 29-hour reading of Jagged Little Pill, an original musical written by Diablo Cody based on the music of Grammy Award-winning artist Alanis Morissette, that included stars such as Idina Menzel. She originated one of the lead roles of the show, Frankie Healy: a 17-year-old black, bisexual activist who was adopted into an affluent white family in a suburb in Connecticut. She participated in the 2018 lab and later the world premiere of the show at the American Repertory Theatre in Cambridge, Massachusetts in May 2018.

Gooding reprised their role as Frankie when the show transferred to Broadway in November 2019 at the Broadhurst Theatre. She received accolades including Broadway World's Debut of the Month, a Clives Barnes Award nomination, and Broadway.com's Debut of the Year. They were also honored as one of BET's Future 40. She also performed on Late Night with Seth Meyers, Dick Clark's New Year's Rockin' Eve with Ryan Seacrest, and Good Morning America.

In 2019, Gooding and their mother, LaChanze, made history by becoming the first mother and daughter ever to perform on Broadway at the same time, with LaChanze starring in A Christmas Carol, and Gooding starring in Jagged Little Pill.

Gooding received accolades for their performance in Jagged Little Pill, which closed indefinitely due to the COVID-19 pandemic. They received the award for Best Actor in a Featured Role in a Musical at the inaugural Antonyo Awards and was nominated for the Tony Award for Best Actress in a Featured Role in a Musical. They also participated in the 2020 Playbill Pride Spectacular along with co-star Lauren Patten.

They appear in the Paramount+ series Star Trek: Strange New Worlds as Nyota Uhura.

On September 24, 2021, Gooding announced that they would not be returning to Jagged Little Pill due to alleged transphobic and abusive treatment of the show's non-binary cast members.

Personal life 
Gooding is bisexual and grey asexual. They also have two cats named Pongo and Sushi. Gooding goes by she and they pronouns.

Activism 
Gooding has been particularly vocal about the issues surrounding being Black on Broadway. They participated in the New York Times "Offstage" program in June 2020 that discussed racial justice on Broadway, a panel on ABC about the realities of being black on Broadway for Black History Month, and a Black Theatre Matters benefit panel hosted by Samantha Williams.

Because of her participation in the show Jagged Little Pill, Gooding has also been vocal about justice for the LGBTQ+ community and the interracial adoption adoptee community.

They participated in a panel for normalizing consent and advocacy for sexual assault victims for the summer 2020 series, Transformation 2020: Popular Democracy Defined with co-star Kathryn Gallagher.

Acting credits

Film

Television

Theatre

Discography

Cast recordings

Accolades and honors

References

External links
 
 

2000 births
Living people
Broadway theatre people
American musical theatre actresses
American stage actresses
African-American actresses
Bisexual actresses
Grammy Award winners
LGBT African Americans
20th-century African-American women singers
21st-century African-American people
21st-century LGBT people
21st-century African-American women
American bisexual actors